The Toronto Young Rangers were a Canadian junior ice hockey team in the Ontario Hockey Association from 1937–38 until the conclusion of the 1947–48 season. While most teams in the league had an affiliation with a National Hockey League club, the Young Rangers did not. They were owned, operated and coached by Ed Wildey (November 22, 1875 – July 19, 1964), a Toronto sportsman who worked out an arrangement with Conn Smythe that saw the team practise early mornings at Maple Leaf Gardens in Toronto. During the 1940–41 season, Wildey was able to secure sponsorship and the team was known as the "Bowles Rangers." The team took a one-year hiatus for the 1942–43 season. For his contributions to junior hockey, in 1962, Ed Wildey was awarded the Gold Stick, an order of merit in hockey awarded by the OHA for outstanding service to the game other than as a player. Such outstanding service must have been for a period of not less than 10 years continuous duration.

Notable players
Two former Young Rangers have been inducted into the Hockey Hall of Fame: Gordie Drillon as a player and Punch Imlach as a builder.

List of National Hockey League alumni:

Season-by-season results
Results prior to the 1937–38 season are incomplete.

References

Defunct Ontario Hockey League teams
Yo